Pterostylis extranea is a plant in the orchid family Orchidaceae and is endemic to Queensland. It was first formally described in 2010 by David Jones and given the name Oligochaetochilus extraneus. The description was published in the journal The Orchadian from a specimen grown in the Australian National Botanic Gardens from a tuber collected near Eungella Dam. In 2010, Jasmine Janes and Marco Duretto changed the name to Pterostylis extranea. The specific epithet (extranea) is a Latin word meaning "strange".

References

extranea
Orchids of Queensland
Plants described in 2010
Taxa named by David L. Jones (botanist)